Virginia Smith may refer to:

 Virginia B. Smith (1923–2010), president of Vassar College
 Virginia D. Smith (1911–2006), U.S. representative from Nebraska
 Virginia Thrall Smith (1836–1903), American children's advocate
 Virginia Smith Converter Station, near Sidney, Nebraska